Nightmares & Dreamscapes: From the Stories of Stephen King is an eight-episode anthology series that aired on TNT, based on short stories written by American author Stephen King. It debuted on July 12, 2006, and ended its run on August 2, 2006. Although most of the stories are from the book collection of the same title, some are from different collections by King. A trailer confirming a DVD edition of the series was released in October 2006. The series was filmed entirely in Melbourne, Australia.

Production
Episodes based on stories from the Nightmares & Dreamscapes collection are "Umney's Last Case", "You Know They Got a Hell of a Band", "The End of the Whole Mess", "The Fifth Quarter" and "Crouch End". "The Road Virus Heads North" and "Autopsy Room Four" are adaptations of stories from Everything's Eventual (2002), and "Battleground" is from Night Shift (1978).

Stars include Tom Berenger, William H. Macy, Kim Delaney, Steven Weber, Ron Livingston, William Hurt, Samantha Mathis, Jacinta Stapleton and an uncredited Bill Barretta as Savage Commando.

The special effects for the series were provided by Jim Henson's Creature Shop.

Episodes

Home media
The complete series was released on DVD on October 26, 2006.

References

External links
 

2006 American television series debuts
2006 American television series endings
Television shows based on works by Stephen King
2000s American television miniseries
TNT (American TV network) original programming
2000s American anthology television series
English-language television shows
Television shows about dreams
Films based on works by Stephen King
Television shows filmed in Australia